Acarospora citrina is a lichen in the family, Acarosporaceae, first described as Urceolaria citrina by 
Thomas Taylor in 1847.  It was assigned to the genus, Acarospora, in 1913 by Alexander Zahlbruckner.

This lichen has been found in all mainland states of Australia, on rocks in  sclerophyll woodland.

References

External links
Acarospora citrina: images and occurrence data from GBIF

Taxa named by Thomas Taylor (botanist)
Lichen species
citrina
Lichens described in 1847
Lichens of Australia